Ubiquitin carboxyl-terminal hydrolase 47 is an enzyme that in humans is encoded by the USP47 gene.

References

Further reading